100-ball cricket is a short form of cricket designed to attract new audiences to the game with simplified rules, which was originally created by the England and Wales Cricket Board (ECB) for its new city-based competition The Hundred. 

The 100 ball game has two teams each having a single innings, which is restricted to a maximum of 100 balls, and the match lasts approximately two and a half hours, somewhat shorter than the existing Twenty20 format.

Before the launch of the professional The Hundred competition in July 2021, the 100-ball format was trialled in several amateur local leagues across England.

History

Origins 
The new 100-ball format was born out of a proposal by the England and Wales Cricket Board (ECB) in 2016 to launch a new franchise cricket competition, similar to the Indian Premier League. At first it was expected that the competition would use the existing Twenty20 format.

Following discussions involving the ECB's marketing team, clubs were instead told in April 2018 that the competition would use an entirely new form of cricket designed to be simpler to follow and shorter to fit television schedules. The more detailed proposal was presented by the ECB to the chair and chief executives of the first-class counties and the MCC on 19 April 2018, and was unanimously supported by the board of the new competition. At first it was proposed that each innings would involve 15 six-ball overs and a final 10-ball over.

In February 2019, the ECB announced tweaks to the proposed rules of 100-ball cricket. The competition will instead contain 10 ten-ball overs, i.e. a change of ends after ten balls. A bowler will be delivering five or 10 consecutive balls. A bowler would deliver a maximum of 20 balls per innings. Power-play conditions were also announced.

Amateur competitions 
Trial events using the format have taken place at The Purchasers annual cricket festival at Belmont House in Kent, and club level in England.

In November 2018, the Warwickshire Cricket Board and Warwickshire County Cricket Club launched the 100-ball format club level tournament, which is designed to revitalise Sunday cricket at clubs across the Midlands. Called the Warwickshire Sunday Smash, the 16 team tournament is split into three divisions, with each side playing each team both home and away, throughout June and July. The teams include Solihull Blossomfield Cricket Club, Knowle & Dorridge, Sutton Coldfield, Bedworth, Alcester & Ragley, Stratford upon Avon, Water Orton, Four Oaks Saints, Moseley Ashfield and Aston Manor, who are all members of the Midlands Club Cricket Conference. The winners of each league and the best second place progressing to the Semi-Finals Day. The Finals Day took place on 1 September 2019 at Edgbaston. Stratford Upon Avon beat Knowle & Dorridge to win the first 100 ball competition in the U.K.

Shropshire County Cricket Club introduced the Swancote Energy Smash, which began in June 2019. It is a six-team tournament that has been divided into two groups, with games being played every Thursday night. The winners of each group is due to play in the inaugural final in early September 2019. The six teams are Shifnal, Claverley, Worfield, Bridgnorth, Chelmarsh and Wombourne.

In May 2021 Shropshire Cricket league launched two 100-ball knock out competitions, known as the Aaron's 100 and Aaron's Premier 100, involving 53 teams from across Shropshire and mid-Wales.

Cricket Wales launched the Cricket Wales U19’s 100 Ball Cup for under 19 year olds. It started on 25 June 2021 and is due to end with the final on 13 August 2021 at Ynystawe Cricket Club.

Professional competition 
The first professional competition using the 100-ball format was The Hundred in July 2021. The Hundred involves eight men's and women's teams across England and Wales. The first professional match using the new format involved the women's teams of the Oval Invincibles and Manchester Originals who played each other at The Oval in London on 21 July 2021.

The Africa Cricket Association plans to hold an annual 100-ball competition to further boost the game within the continent.

Format
100-ball cricket is a form of limited overs cricket, played by two teams each playing a single innings made up of 100 balls.

The format of the game is:
100 balls per innings
A change of ends after 10 balls
Bowlers deliver either five or 10 consecutive balls
Each bowler can deliver a maximum of 20 balls per game
Each bowling side gets a strategic timeout of up to two and a half minutes
A 25-ball powerplay start for each team
Two fielders are allowed outside the initial 30-yard circle during the powerplay
Teams will be able to call timeouts, as has been the case in the Indian Premier League since 2009 
The non-striker must return to their original end after a caught dismissal
A simplified scoreboard is used
In some cases, ties are broken by having each team bat for a 5-ball innings. Subsequent 5-ball innings may be played if the tie persists.

Reactions
Some experts have stated that proposals for the new format outlined by the ECB are nothing more than a further step towards "fast-food cricket", whereas others are appreciating it as a brilliant innovation.

England's then Test captain, Joe Root, welcomed the ECB's plans for its new-team format in 2020. According to Root, it will attract a completely new audience. ODI and T20 captain, Eoin Morgan, had a similar opinion about this format. Former T20 captain Stuart Broad said he was hugely optimistic about the new format. Michael Vaughan also echoed with Broad and stated that it will be a more appealing concept to broadcasters. Michael Atherton shared that a T20 match was to be completed in a 3-hour window and this can be achieved with the proposed format.

New Zealand all-rounder Jimmy Neesham was bemused on this move, asking why the England and Wales Cricket Board is trying something different when the current format is already so successful. Current limited overs specialists Dawid Malan and Mark Wood shared that in spite of the new format, T20s will still remain as the preference.

Former MCC chief Keith Bradshaw called the 100-ball tournament an innovation for innovation's sake, reasoning that the main reason behind this thought process is that the ECB couldn't exploit the T20 boom. The England and Wales Professional Cricketers' Association shared that, overall, players were open to this new idea.

Meanwhile, Cricket Australia has no plans to tinker with its existing Big Bash League. It also shared a concern that the introduction of shorter formats is further ignoring Test cricket.

Olympic consideration 
A bid for the sport’s inclusion at Los Angeles 2028 has received backing from the International Cricket Council (ICC) but a decision has yet to be made about which format of the game to propose. Mahela Jayawardene sits on the ICC’s own Cricket Committee, which is considering the format to be proposed and is also coach of the Southern Brave franchise men's team in The Hundred - a new short form of the game.

"We will have to wait and see once the tournament has kicked off, the enthusiasm for it and how people embrace it," Jayawardene told the Daily Mail.

"T20 was discussed as a format, T10 is an option, so why not the Hundred? 

"If it goes well, the time is compact and you get to finish in two and a half hours - it would be brilliant."

Any choice of format would have to be approved by the IOC and fall under the aegis of the recognized International Federation, in this case the ICC.

See also
The Hundred

References

External links
 Vithushan Ehantharajah: Orange ball at The Hundred? CricBuzz, 20 September 2018
George Dobell: India players unlikely to feature in The Hundred, admits Tom Harrison ESPN Cricinfo, 21 February 2019

Limited overs cricket
Short form cricket